The Jesse Tay House is a historic house at 51 Elm Street in Stoneham, Massachusetts.  The two-story wood-frame house, built c. 1810 for Jesse Tay, is one of Stoneham's best-preserved Federal style houses.  It has a side-gable roof, asymmetrically placed chimneys, and a four-bay facade with irregular placement of windows and entrance.  The entrance is sheltered by a portico with a fully pedimented gable, and square supporting posts.  Ells project to the rear and left side.  Tay was a farmer and shoemaker, and it is possible that one of the additions was used by him or other family members for the home-based manufacture of shoes.

The house was listed on the National Register of Historic Places in 1984.

See also
National Register of Historic Places listings in Stoneham, Massachusetts
National Register of Historic Places listings in Middlesex County, Massachusetts

References

Houses on the National Register of Historic Places in Stoneham, Massachusetts
Federal architecture in Massachusetts
Houses completed in 1810
Houses in Stoneham, Massachusetts